The Hockaday Comet was a two-seat light civil aircraft, built in the United States before World War II but not flown until near the war's end. It failed to attract buyers and only one was completed.

Design

The design of the Hockaday Comet, led by H.W. Yarick, began in October 1939 when the Hockaday Aircraft Corporation was founded. It followed the classic single engine, high braced monoplane layout pioneered for small cabin aircraft in the early 1930s by, for example, the Taylor Cub.

It was substantially complete by May 1939, powered by a  Allied Monsoon engine. This was a licence-built French Régnier L.4 four-cylinder, air-cooled inverted inline unit. However, work on the Comet was halted in 1940 when the company were preoccupied with sub-contract work for others. In spring 1944 work resumed and it made its first flight in June.

It had a one-piece wing of rectangular plan out to semi-elliptical tips and built around two spruce spars and plywood ribs. There was no dihedral. The leading edge was ply covered, with fabric elsewhere. The centre-section was joined to the upper fuselage frame by internal, vertical struts and the wing braced on each side with a parallel pair of streamlined steel tubes between the wing spars and the lower fuselage frame. Its short, broad ailerons were metal framed, fabric covered apart from duralumin leading edges and externally mass-balanced.

The Comet's fuselage had a welded steel tube structure, with a light wooden-framed upper section aft of the cabin. Apart from the engine housing, the fuselage was fabric covered. It was advertised with a choice of two flat-six engines, a  Franklin or a  Continental C125. Both drove a two-bladed propeller. Electric generator and starter were provided. Fuel and oil tanks were in the enclosed cabin, which had two side-by-side seats, with a large transparency in the wing centre section above them and accessed via a door on each side. The cabin was equipped with dual controls, radio and blind-flying instrumentation.

The empennage had a steel tube structure and was fabric covered, with wire bracing between the fin, the in-flight adjustable tailplane and the lower fuselage. The fin and tailplane were broadly straight-edged, carrying curved elevators and rudder. The latter extended to the keel and worked in a cut-out between the elevators.

Legs and wheels were enclosed in generous fairings. Its tailwhel, mounted on a long, vertical, sprung leg, was steerable from the rudder bar via a link from an external extension of the rudder hinge.

Despite intensive advertising, for example in Flying magazine, the Comet failed to attract buyers in the post-World War II market and only the prototype was built.

Specifications

References

1940s United States civil utility aircraft
Aircraft first flown in 1944